White Ladye was a steam yacht built in 1891 by Ramage & Ferguson of Leith from a design by W C Storey. She had 3 masts; length 204 ft; breadth 27 ft; 142 hp steam powered.  She was built for Francis Edward Baring (Lord Ashburton) and named White Ladye.

Lillie Langtry bought the yacht in 1891. From 1893 Langtry leased the vessel to Ogden Goelet who used it until his own yacht Mayflower  was complete and his death in 1897.  It was then sold at auction to John Lawson Johnston the 'inventor' of the meat extract Bovril and remained in his ownership until his death on board at Cannes France in 1900.   In 1902/3 she was recorded in the Lloyd's Yacht Register as being owned by shipbuilder William Cresswell Gray, Tunstall Manor, West Hartlepool and remained so until 1915. Following this the Lloyd's Register records that she became French trawler La Champagne based in Fécamp and was broken up in 1935.

Sale by auction in 1897

Langtry put the White Ladye up for auction in November 1897 at the Mart, Tokenhouse Yard, London.  The yacht was described as follows:   
The machinery includes a set of triple expansion engines (of 142 horsepower, nominal), a return tubular boiler of steel, with a working pressure of 160lb to the square inch, and she carries 130 tons of coal, of which there are now 50 tons in her bunkers. The speed of the yacht is about thirteen knots an hour, on a consumption of half a ton of fuel. With regard to the sanitary equipment, there are three baths fitted with hot and cold, salt and fresh water. The lighting throughout is electric, with pneumatic bells and speaking tubes. There are nine sleeping apartments, exclusive of those required for the captain, officers, and crew. The drawing room extends the full breadth of the vessel, with grand piano, dining saloon (finished in walnut), deck-house saloon, chart room, and galley on deck, as well as bachelors quarters, entirely apart from the main cabins, and reached by a separate companion way. The special feature of the yacht is a very large state boudoir suite, extending the entire breadth of the yacht, containing full-sized swing bed, beautifully draped. This suite is decorated in white enamel and gold, upholstered in salmon pink broché panels, with silk-lined draperies and velvet plush carpets, and furniture to match. Attached is a dressing room, a marble bath, lavatories, and a maids room. White Ladye carries a steam launch, gig, two cutters, and two dinghy’s. The yacht originally cost £40.000, and Mrs. Langtry had refused an offer of £22,000 for it. The steamer had been hired by the late Mr. Ogden Goelet for £1000 a month.

An earlier article, written in July 1893 after White Ladye's first Atlantic crossing from Cowes to New York, said that the bunkers could hold 180 tons of coal and cruising at 11 knots 12 tons were consumed per day.  The captain estimated that a direct Atlantic crossing in favourable weather could have been made in 13 days.

Langtry's first cruise
The White Ladye left Cowes in January 1893 for the South of France and Lillie Langtry followed by train some weeks later.  The yacht hit bad weather on the journey from Cowes and some damage to the living quarters occurred which had to be repaired after arrival at Marseilles.  It was during the Mediterranean cruise that Langtry learnt of the death of George Alexander Baird on March 18, 1893 in New Orleans.  She immediately made for Nice and caught the train back to London. The White Ladye returned to Cowes in April of that year and by July was in America under charter to Goelet.

The Goelet years
Ogden Goelet was from a wealthy family of New York real estate owners and developers.  He was a keen yachtsman, member of the New York Yacht Club and sponsored several yacht racing events.  He chartered the White Ladye from Langtry each season from 1893 until his death in 1897.  He used the yacht for socialising in America, Britain and the South of France and for attending international yacht racing regattas.  The White Ladye was even used on occasions to tow premier racing yachts to events, including the Prince of Wales Britannia and Andrew Barclay Walker's Alisa.  Goelet was also on friendly terms with Edward, Prince of Wales, whom he entertained on board the White Ladye, meeting Queen Victoria on one occasion in Nice, South of France when their yachts were moored next to each other.

In 1897 Goelet took delivery of a new yacht at Cowes called Mayflower that he had commissioned and built on the Clyde in Scotland.  This was a sister ship to one that his brother was also having constructed at the same yard, lat  These vessels were larger and more powerful than the White Ladye but Goelet became ill and died not long after taking delivery.  The Mayflower was later sold to the US Navy and became famous as the Presidential Yacht USS Mayflower (PY-1)., his brother's yacht the USS Nahma (SP-771).

The Lawson Johnston years 
John Lawson Johnston started his career as a butcher working in Edinburgh.  He became interested in food science and developed a beef extract that had a long shelf life.  He moved to Canada and supplied the French army with preserved beef products.  On returning to Britain he set up a factory in London to manufacture a product called Bovril, boosting sales by mass advertising.  He raised capital via stock flotations, the first in 1889 and the second in 1896, when he and his fellow shareholders agreed to sell the business to Ernest Terah Hooley.  Lawson Johnston remained a major shareholder in Bovril and the company chairman.

He purchased the White Ladye at auction in 1897 for £11,200.  A few weeks before this he had purchased a famous racing yacht that belonged to the Prince of Wales called Britannia.  This he sold shortly after, having owned it for just a few months.  It later transpired that Ernest Hooley had funded the purchase of a yacht for Lawson Johnston, and several press reports conjectured that the vessel concerned was the White Ladye.  However, evidence later given in a court case by Hooley indicated that the arrangement concerned the purchase of the sailing yacht Britannia.

Lawson Johnston used the White Ladye for cruising in the Mediterranean and Scottish waters, and in 1899 the yacht attended the America's Cup race in New York.  The event was between Columbia and Thomas Lipton’s Shamrock.  The White Ladye was supposed to be companion yacht to Lipton’s steam yacht Erin with friends and relatives on both vessels.  Lawson Johnston understood that he would be able to fly a flag of privilege that enable him to manoeuvre the White Ladye within the restricted race area.  However, the race officials deemed that the White Ladye had infringed a restricted zone and the captain was severely censured.  To make matters worse, one of the official cutters policing the event collided with White Ladye causing damage to both vessels.

In 1900 Lawson Johnston took a lease on Inveraray Castle and cruised the Scottish waters in White Ladye before the yacht sailed to Nice in the South of France.  It was there that John Lawson Johnston died on board the White Ladye on the 24 November 1900.

The William Cresswell Gray Years
After the death of Lawson Johnston, the White Ladye was purchased by William Cresswell Gray (1867-1924).  He was chairman of William Gray and Co., of West Hartlepool, one of the largest shipbuilders in the country, a business that had been started by his father in 1863.  Gray became chairman in 1898 after the deaths of his older brother in 1896, his father in 1898 and Thomas Mudd, manager of the company's engine works, in 1898.  Gray who, enjoyed “yachting”, sent the White Ladye to Hull in 1903 for a new boiler and general overhaul.  He arranged for the yacht to be moored in Dartmouth, due to the fact that he had purchased the Membland Estate, South Devon in 1900, about 26 miles from Dartmouth.  However, by 1905 the yacht was being offered for charter, and this was taken up by the wealthy American, Bertha Palmer, widow of Potter Palmer from Chicago, who attended Cowes Week that year. She also took the prestigious Egypt House on the seafront in the expectation of entertaining high society. By 1910 the advertisements for the charter of the White Ladye also informed that the yacht was for sale.

During  World War I several of the large steam yachts were purchased by the British government for use by the Royal Navy, others were put to commercial use.  The White Ladye was sold and converted in 1917 for use as a French trawler named La Champagne, owned by Jérôme Malandain de Fécamp.  She remained in this role from September 1918 until 1926 when she was laid up at Fécamp.  In June 1931 she was used to test the new slipway at Fécamp.  In August 1935 she was towed by the Belgian tug Directeur Gerling out of harbour on her final journey to the breakers at Ostende.

Registry images 

 WL-250 Banjo

References 

Ships built in Scotland
1891 ships